Helgafellssveit was a municipality in Iceland. In March 2022, residents of Helgafellssveit and the neighboring municipality of Stykkishólmur voted to merge the two municipalities into one.

References

Municipalities of Iceland